Scooby-Doo! Ghastly Goals  is the fifth direct-to-DVD special produced by Warner Bros. Animation, based upon the Scooby-Doo Saturday morning cartoons. It was available May 13, 2014, only through Scooby-Doo! 13 Spooky Tales: Field of Screams DVD.

Plot
Scooby and the gang are in Rio, Brazil enjoying a parade celebrating the beginning of the International Soccer Cup (a parody of the FIFA World Cup). Shaggy and Scooby leave the parade to get some more food and Scooby helps some kids find an errant, flying soccer ball. Scooby searches a nearby alley and finds the ball but not before he's chased away by a red, horned monster.

The monster chases Scooby, and soon afterward Shaggy, out onto the parade route. After running off the spectators and smashing into floats, Scooby knocks it down with the soccer ball from the alley and he and Shaggy rejoin Velma, Fred, and Daphne. The group tries to subdue the monster, but it disappears in a cloud of smoke. The police cordone the area and the kids who lost their soccer ball catch up to Shaggy and Scooby to ask for their autographed missing ball. Velma identifies the monster as a trickster called 'Eshu'. Fred promises the kids they will find the autographed ball and the gang ask Julio Luna, the director of the games, for help. He tells them all the spilled soccer balls on the parade route were taken back to the stadium, including the kids' ball that was mixed in with them.

Sneaking into the stadium, the gang manages to find the equipment room where all the soccer balls are stored. Eshu is also there and chases after Shaggy and Scooby before a security guard arrives and sounds the alarm. Once again, the monster disappears in a cloud of dust and after a hasty retreat, Fred determines the Eshu is looking for the same autographed ball. The next day, they go to the alley where Scooby first encountered Eshu. Daphne finds a broken test tube that's labelled as belonging to Professor Eduardo Perez. When they go to the professor's research lab, they're stopped by an angry security guard, but another scientist overhears what they found and brings them to the eccentric Professor Perez. They learn that the test tube was filled with an experimental liquid that modifies the quality of rubber (making it extra strong and bouncy) and it was stolen by Eshu the previous day.

The gang figures that Eshu accidentally spilled the experimental liquid onto the kids' soccer ball in the alley and wants to find the ball to extract the formula and sell it. They sneak back into the stadium and realize the autographed ball has been taken out onto the field. They manage to make it onto the pitch, but the autographed ball is being taken out to play. Scooby quickly dons a jersey and joins the Brazilian team. Scooby intercepts the super strong, super bouncy ball and manages to score a winning goal for Brazil in the final seconds of the match. Suddenly Eshu appears but after a few too many kicks, the supercharged ball gains momentum and crashes into the monster, sending it straight through the net and trapping it.

Eshu is unmasked to be Reynaldo, the angry security guard from the research lab. The security guard reveals he has always wanted to be a magician and wanted the money from the serum sale to fund his magician dreams. He used trickery and a little smoke to "disappear". The security guard is taken away and the gang makes sure that the autographed ball is returned to its rightful owner after they remove the serum on it. For saving the tournament, the gang is rewarded with pizzas on a stick and Scooby manages to expertly deflect an errant soccer ball before the end.

Cast
 Frank Welker as Scooby-Doo, Fred Jones, Eshu
 Matthew Lillard as Shaggy Rogers
 Mindy Cohn as Velma Dinkley
 Grey DeLisle as Daphne Blake
 Carlos Alazraqui as Brazilian player
 Gabriel Iglesias as Professor Eduardo Perez
 Andrew Kishino as Security guard
 Christian Lanz as Cart owner
 Mina Olivera as Dr. Marla Riganto
 Rob Paulsen as Julio Luna
 Danny Trejo as Reynaldo

References

External links
 

2014 animated films
Scooby-Doo specials
American television films
2010s American animated films
Warner Bros. Animation animated films
Warner Bros. direct-to-video animated films
Brazil in fiction
American association football films
Animated direct-to-video specials
2014 television films
Films directed by Victor Cook